Serme is a surname. Notable people with the surname include:

Anna Serme (born 1991), Czech squash player
Camille Serme (born 1989), French squash player
Lucas Serme (born 1990), French squash player